Konahra is a village in Chand block of Kaimur district, Bihar, India. As of 2011, its population was 806, in 157 households.

References 

Villages in Kaimur district